This is a list of notable equestrian statues by country. The sculptures are listed by the date of their inauguration, regardless whether they were later dismantled or torn down.

Albania

Algeria

Argentina

Buenos Aires

Buenos Aires (province)

Catamarca

Chaco

Chubut

Córdoba

Corrientes

Entre Ríos

Formosa

Jujuy

La Pampa

La Rioja

Mendoza

Misiones

Neuquén

Río Negro

Salta

San Juan

San Luis

Santa Cruz

Santa Fe

Santiago del Estero

Tucumán

Armenia

Aruba

Australia

Australian Capital Territory

New South Wales

Queensland

South Australia

Victoria

Western Australia

Austria

Vienna

Burgenland

Lower Austria

Tyrol

Azerbaijan

Belgium

Bolivia
Caracas
 Equestrian statue of Simon Bolívar in Plaza Bolívar,  by Adamo Tadolino

Bosnia and Herzegovina
Bijeljina
 Equestrian of King Petar I Karađorđević by Rudolf Valdec, 1926 (was demolished by Ustashas in 1941, restored in 1992).

Brazil

Pernambuco

Rio Grande do Sul

Rio de Janeiro

São Paulo

Bulgaria
Sofia
 Monument to the Tsar Liberator (Alexander II of Russia) in National Assembly Square.

Dobrich
 Monument of Khan Asparuh.

Gabrovo
 Equestrian statue of Don Quixote and Sancho Panza in front of the House of Humour and Satire.

Koprivshtitsa
 Monument of Georgi Benkovski.

Plovdiv
 Monument to Khan Krum.

Targovishte Province
 Monument of Khan Krum near ancient Bulgarian castle Misionis.

Varna
 Monument to Tsar Kaloyan.

Veliko Tarnovo
 Monument of the Asen dynasty with 4 equestrian statues.

Canada

Chile
Santiago de Chile
 Equestrian of José de San Martín.

China

Dalian, Liaoning Province
 Equestrian statue of Guan Xiangying. (Jinzhou District)

Hohhot, Inner Mongolia
 Genghis Khan monument
 Wang Zhaojun and the Xiongnu shanyu Huhanye on horseback (at Zhaojun's Tomb)

Ordos, Inner Mongolia
 Genghis Khan statue before his Mausoleum

Fuboshan, Guilin
 Statue of Ma Yuan

China - Taiwan
Taipei, Taiwan
 Equestrian statue of Yue Fei in Linsen Park

Colombia
Barranquilla
 Equestrian of Simón Bolívar.

Cartagena
 Equestrian of Simón Bolívar.

Medellín
 Equestrian of Simón Bolívar by Eugenio Maccagnani at the Parque de Bolívar.

Croatia
Zagreb
 Equestrian of Ban Josip Jelačić at the Ban Jelačić Square.
 Equestrian of King Tomislav by Robert Frangeš Mihanović, 1928–38, erected in 1947.
 Equestrian of Saint George at the Republic of Croatia Square.
 Equestrian of Saint George at the Trg Braće hrvatskog zmaja.

Cuba
Havana
 Equestrian of Major General Máximo Gómez by Aldo Gamba at the Malecón, 1936.
 Equestrian of Major General Antonio Maceo by Giuseppe Boni at the Malecón.

Czech Republic
Prague
 Equestrian monument of Wenceslaus, Duke of Bohemia by Josef Václav Myslbek at Wenceslas Square, 1912.
 Monument of Wenceslaus, Duke of Bohemia by Jan Jiří Bendl, between 1676 and 1678. Formerly at Wenceslas Square (before 1879), now in Vyšehrad.
 Equestrian monument of Jan Žižka by Bohumil Kafka in Žižkov - 9 m tall.
 Equestrian monument of Francis I by Josef Max on the Vltava bank, 1850.
 Equestrian statue of Jaroslav Hašek near the pubs where he wrote his works in Žižkov by Karel Nepraš and Karolína Neprašová, 2005
 Equestrian statue of Saint George in 3rd courtyard of Prague Castle.

Poděbrady
 Equestrian monument of George of Podebrady by Bohuslav Schnirch at George Square, 1896.

Denmark
Copenhagen
 Equestrian monument of Bishop Absalon in bronze by Vilhelm Bissen on Højbro Plads, erected 1902.
 Equestrian monument of King Christian V by French sculptor Abraham-César Lamoureux (c. 1640–1692) on Kongens Nytorv (The King's New Square). Originally in lead 1688, replaced in 1946 by a bronze copy.
 Equestrian monument of King Frederik V in bronze by Jacques-Francois-Joseph Saly in front of Amalienborg Palace, erected 1771.
 Equestrian monument of Frederik VII in bronze by Herman Wilhelm Bissen on Christiansborg Palace Square, erected 1873.
 Equestrian monument of King Christian IX in bronze by Anne Marie Carl-Nielsen in Christiansborg Palace, erected 1927.
 Equestrian monument of King Christian X in bronze by Einar Utzon-Frank on St. Annæ Square, erected in 1954.

Aarhus
 Equestrian monument of King Christian X in bronze by Helen Schou on Bispetorv (Bishop's Square), erected in 1955.

Aalborg
 Equestrian monument of King Christian IX in bronze by Carl Johan Bonnesen, erected 1910.

Esbjerg
 Equestrian monument of King Christian IX of Denmark in bronze by L. Brandstrup, erected 1899.

Hvidovre
 Equestrian statue of Postrytter (Mail-horseman) placed just outside the old Hvidovre Post Office on Hvidovrevej, by Johannes Bjerg, 1935.

Nakskov
 Equestrian monument of King Christian X in bronze by V. Kvederis, erected in 1952.

Odense 
 Equestrian monument of King Christian IX in bronze by Aksel Hansen, erected 1912.

Slagelse
 Equestrian monument of King Christian IX in bronze by L. Brandstrup, erected 1910.

Egypt
Alexandria
 Equestrian statue of Alexander the Great, 2002.
 Equestrian statue of Muhammad Ali Pasha, 1873.

Cairo
 Equestrian of Ibrahim Pasha in Cairo Citadel in front of National Military Museum, 1872.

England

See: List of equestrian statues in the United Kingdom#England

Estonia
Viljandi
 Equestrian of Commander-in-chief Johan Laidoner by Terje Ojaver at the central city square, 2004.

Ethiopia
Addis Abeba
 Equestrian of Emperor Menelik II at the Menelik II Square.

Finland
Helsinki
 Bronze Equestrian statue of Marshal Mannerheim  (C.G.E. Mannerheim, Marshal of Finland)  located beside the main street Mannerheimintie in front of the Kiasma museum of modern art, by Aimo Tukiainen, erected in 1960.

Lahti
 Bronze equestrian monument of Marshal of Finland C.G.E. Mannerheim, located in Asematori square, by Veikko Leppänen, erected in 1959.
 Equestrian statue The Hakkapeliittas' homecoming, by Pentti Papinaho, erected in 1975.

Lappeenranta
 Equestrian statue Rakuunapatsas (Dragoon) by Pentti Papinaho, erected in 1982.

Rantsila
 Equestrian statue of Field Marshal Johan August Sandels, on his horse Bijou in town centre, by team of sculptors led by Martti Väänänen, erected in 1989.

France
See: List of equestrian statues in France

Georgia
Tbilisi
 Equestrian monument of King Vakhtang Gorgasali.
 Equestrian monument of King David the Builder.
 Equestrian monument of Giorgi Saakadze.
 Equestrian monument of General Petre Bagrationi.
 Freedom Monument at the Freedom Square with equestrian statue of Saint George by Zurab Tsereteli, 2006.

Kutaisi
 Equestrian monument of King David the Builder.

Poti
 Equestrian monument of Prince Tsotne Dadiani.

Telavi
 Equestrian monument of King Erekle II.

Germany
See: List of equestrian statues in Germany

Greece
Athens
 Equestrian statue of King Konstantinos I at the entrance of Pedion Areos park.
 Equestrian statue of General Kolokotronis at the Old Parliament Square.
 Equestrian statue of General Papagos.
 Persian Rider, statue in the Acropolis Museum

Arta
 Equestrian statue of King Pyrrhus.

Thessaloniki
 Equestrian statue of Alexander the Great on the waterfront. Bucephalus is standing on two legs.
 Equestrian statue of King Konstantinos I at the Square of Democracy (Vardariou).

Hungary
See: List of equestrian statues in Hungary

India
Agra
 Equestrian statue of Rani Laxmi Bai.

Chennai
 Equestrian statue of Sir Thomas Munroe - Governor of Madras 1820–1827.
 Equestrian statue of Dheeran Chinnamalai - in Guindy, Chennai.
 Equestrian statue of Vallavaraiyan Vandiyadevan

Dhubri
 Equestrian statue of Chilarai.

Bangalore
 Equestrian statue of Sir Mark Cubbon in Cubbon Park. Location: . Ordered from Baron Maroschetti and unveiled on the 16 March 1866

Imphal
 Marjing Polo Statue
 Statue of Meidingu Nara Singh

Kolhapur
 Equestrian statue of Rani Tara Bai. Location: 

Kolkata
 Edward VII memorial arch with a bronze equestrian statue of the King by Sir Bertram Mackennal close to Victoria Memorial.
 Equestrian statue of Bagha Jatin by the side of the Victoria Memorial.

Thanjavur
 Equestrian statue of Raja Raja Chola I.

Mumbai
 Equestrian statue of Chhatrapati Shivaji in Colaba.
 Equestrian statue of Chhatrapati Shivaji.

Pune
 Equestrian statue of Peshwa Baji Rao. Location: .

Punjab
 Equestrian statue of Ranjit Singh at Golden Temple complex, Amritsar.

Solapur
 Equestrian statue of Rani Laxmi Bai.

Shimla
 Equestrian statue of Rani Laxmi Bai.

Indonesia
Jakarta
 Prince Diponegoro Monument at Merdeka Square, Jakarta.

Cilacap
 Equestrian statue of Diponegoro at Provincial Border, Cilacap.

Semarang
 Equestrian statue of Diponegoro at University of Diponegoro, Semarang.
 Equestrian statue of Diponegoro at Komando Daerah Militer, Semarang.

Salatiga
 Equestrian statue of Diponegoro at the intersection of Jl. Diponegoro and Jl. Jenderal Sudirman.
Jogjakarta
 Equestrian statue of Nyi Ageng Serang at Wates, Jakarta.

Makassar
 Equestrian statue of Sultan Hasanudin at Hasanudin Airport, Makassar.

Magelang
 Equestrian statue of Pangeran Diponegoro at Alun-alun Magelang (Magelang city square).

The equestrian statue of Pangeran Diponegoro became the symbol of military territorial command of Central Java, hence the name Kodam Diponegoro. As a result almost in every main road provincial borders between Central Java Province with its adjacent provinces such as West and East Java provinces, stood those equestrian statues.

Iran

Mashhad
 Bronze Statue of Nader Shah at Nader's mausoleum by Abolhassan Khan Sadighi, 1956.

Zabol
 Bronze statue of Yaqub-e Layth at Central Square of the city, by Abolhassan Khan Sadighi, 1977.

Iraq
Baghdad
 Equestrian statue of Faisal I of Iraq, 1933.

Ireland
Boyle
 Gaelic Chieftain by Maurice Harron at the Curlew Pass, in site of the Battle of Curlew Pass, 1999.

Israel
Hurfeish
 Equestrian statue of Sultan al-Atrash.

Jerusalem
 Monument to Sultan of Egypt and Syria Saladin.

Kfar Tavor
 Monument to village founders.

Kiryat Tiv'on
 Monument in memory of Alexander Zaid near Beit She'arim National Park, statue by David Polus.

Tel Aviv
 Monument of Meir Dizengoff, first Mayor of Tel Aviv, on Rothschild Boulevard (near Dizengoff's home, now a museum), by David Zundelovich.

Mikve Israel
 Monument of German Emperor Wilhelm the Second meeting Zionist leader Theodore Herzel.

Italy
See: List of equestrian statues in Italy

Japan
Tokyo
 Equestrian statue of Kusunoki Masashige by Kōtarō Takamura outside the Imperial Palace, 1897.
 Equestrian statue of Prince Arisugawa Taruhito at the Arisugawa Memorial Park, 1903.
 Equestrian statue of Prince Kitashirakawa Yoshihisa n the outer gardens of the Imperial Palace, 1904.
 Equestrian statue of Prince Komatsu Akihito at the Ueno Park, 1912.
 Equestrian statue of Field marshal Ōyama Iwao in Kudanzaka, 1918.
 Equestrian statue of Nitta Yoshisada close to Bubaikawara Station in Fuchū, 1988.

Kanazawa
 Equestrian statue of Maeda Toshiie close to Oyama Shrine.

Kobe
 Equestrian statue of Don Quixote at the Suma Rikyu Park.

Kōchi
 Equestrian statue of Yamauchi Kazutoyo in the Kōchi Castle.

Komatsushima
 Equestrian statue of Minamoto Yoshitsune. The tallest equestrian statue in Japan (6.7 meters high).

Kumagaya
 Equestrian statue of Kumagai Naozane close to Kumagaya Station.

Kushimoto
 Equestrian statue of Mustafa Kemal Atatürk, placed as a token of friendship between Japan and Turkey.

Nagano
 Takeda Shingen versus equestrian Uesugi Kenshin in Kawanakajima.

Nagoya
 Equestrian statue of Francesco Sforza in Nagoya International Conference Center, 1989
 Equestrian statue of Maeda Toshiie in Arako.

Osaka
 Equestrian statue of Kusunoki Masashige in Kanshinji temple in Kawachinagano.

Ōsaki
 Equestrian statue of Date Masamune close to Yūbikan Station.

Sendai
 Equestrian statue of Date Masamune in the Aoba Castle, 1933

Ueda
 Equestrian statue of Sanada Yukimura.

Wakayama
 Equestrian statue of Tokugawa Yoshimune.

Jordan
Al-Karak
 Equestrian statue of Sultan of Egypt and Syria Saladin.

Kazakhstan
Aktobe
 Equestrian statue of Abul Khair Khan.

Korday
 Equestrian statue of Utegen-Baghatur in front of The Palace of Culture.

Nur-Sultan
 Equestrian statue of Kazakh Khan Kenesary Kasymov.
 Equestrian statue of Baghatur Bogenbay.

Oral
 Equestrian statue of Vasily Chapayev across from the train station, 1980s.
 Monument of Misha Gavrilov, young Red Army soldier during the Russian Civil War. The injured horse lies under the rider.

Taraz
 Equestrian statue of Baydibek Karsha-Uly (sculptured by D.Aldekov and N.Rustemov) at the city central square, 2002.

Korea, Democratic People's Republic of
Pyongyang
 King Dongmyeong of Goguryeo equestrian statue at Tomb of King Tongmyong.

Korea, Republic of
 Equestrian statue of Kim Yushin in Gyeongju National Park.
 Equestrian statue of Gang Gam-chan in Nakseongdae Park.
 Equestrian statue of Gwak Jaeu in Mangu Park in Daegu.

Kosovo
Pristina
 Equestrian of Skanderbeg.

Kyrgyzstan
Bishkek
 Equestrian statue of Mikhail Frunze at a large park (Boulevard Erkindik) across from the train station. Foto
 Equestrian statue of Manas in front of Philharmonic.

Latvia
Riga
 Equestrian monument of Peter the Great, at Brīvības gatves, by German sculptor Schmidt-Kossel, erected in 1910. The statue was evacuated and lost during WW1, but was later returned to Riga.

Lithuania
Vilnius
 Equestrian monument of Gediminas, in the Lower Castle, by Vytautas Kašuba, 1996.
 Equestrian statue Gražina in the Great courtyard of the Seimas Palace, by Dalia Matulaitė
 Equestrian statue of Saint George defeating the dragon in Gediminas Avenue, by Kęstute Balčiūnas, 2005 (replacing an earlier statue destroyed by the Nazis in 1944).

Birštonas
 Monument to Vytautas the Great, by G. Jokūbonis and V. Čekanauskas, 1998.

Luxembourg
Luxembourg
 Equestrian of Grand Duke Willem II by Antonin Mercié at the Place de Guillaune.

North Macedonia
Skopje
 Equestrian "Warrior on a horse" greek kingdom of Macedonia (Alexander the Great)
 Equestrian of Macedonian revolutionary Goce Delčev
 Equestrian of Macedonian revolutionary Dame Gruev
 Equestrian of Skanderbeg.

Bitola

 Equestrian of Philip II of Macedon

Mexico
Mexico City
 Equestrian statue of Charles IV of Spain, in the downtown, by Tolsá.
 Equestrian statue of José de San Martín (sculptor unknown) donated by the government of Argentina to Mexico and on display at the intersection of Paseo de la Reforma and Eje 1 Norte near Metro Garibaldi.

Chihuahua
 Equestrian statue of Pancho Villa.

Chinameca
 Equestrian statue of Emiliano Zapata at the Hacienda de Chinameca, Morelos state, site of Zapata's death.

Zacatecas
 Equestrian statue of Pancho Villa at the summit of the Cerro de la Bufa overlooking the city.

Moldova
Chişinău
 Equestrian monument of Grigore Kotovski by Lazar Dubinovsky at the Kotovski square, 1954.

Tiraspol
 Equestrian monument of Alexander Suvorov by Valentin and Victor Artamonovs at the Suvorov square, 1979.

Mongolia
Ulaanbaatar
 Equestrian monument of Damdin Sükhbaatar at Sükhbaatar Square by Sonomyn Choimbol, 1946.
 Equestrian statue of Genghis Khan.
 Equestrian statue of Genghis Khan in Buyant-Ukhaa International Airport.
 Two equestrian statues of Genghis Khan's Generals in front of modern State Great Khural building.

Tov aimag
 Genghis Khan Equestrian Statue, the largest (40 metres tall) in the world, near Ulaanbaatar. The monument has a viewing platform. The sculptor was Erdembileghijn, and it was erected in 2008.

Khovd
 Equestrian statue of Amursanaa.

Morocco
Casablanca
 Equestrian statue of Hubert Lyautey, 1938, now on the grounds of the french consulate.

Namibia
Windhoek
 Windhoek's Reiterdenkmal is an equestrian monument to the victory of the Germans in the Herero and Namaqua War 1904–1907. Originally situated in front of the Christuskirche, since 2009 in front of Alte Feste. Inaugurated on 27 January 1912.

Netherlands
Amsterdam
 Equestrian statue of Queen Wilhelmina by Theresia van der Pant in the Rokin, 1975.

Breda
 Equestrian of Stadtholder Willem III.

The Hague
 Equestrian of King Willem II by Antonin Mercié, the replica of statue in Luxembourg.
 Equestrian of William I in front of the Noordeinde Palace.

Katwijk aan den Rijn
 De schutter (man on horse) by G.Brouwer, 1986.

Nijmegen

 Equestrian with no identifying plaque on a pillar near the railway station

Rotterdam
 Equestrian of Count Willem IV by Willem Verbon, 1950.

Utrecht
 Equestrian of Saint Willibrordus by Albert Termote at the Janskerkhof, 1941.
 Equestrian of Saint Martinus by Albert Termote, 1948.

Norway
Oslo
 Equestrian monument of King Karl XIV John of Sweden (Karl III John of Norway), at The Royal Palace, by Brynjulf Larsen Bergslien.

Philippines

Peru
Lima
 Equestrian of Francisco Pizarro by Charles Cary Rumsey in the Lima City Walls park.
 Equestrian of José de San Martín by Mariano Benlliure at the Plaza San Martín (Lima).
 Equestrian of Simón Bolivar by Adamo Tadolini at the Legislative Palace (Peru).

Poland
See: List of equestrian statues in Poland

Portugal
Braga
 Equestrian statue of Saint Longinus in Bom Jesus do Monte, 1819 (made of Granite).

Lisbon
 Equestrian statue of King José I by Joaquim Machado de Castro at the Praça do Comércio, 1775.
 Equestrian statue of King João I by Leopoldo de Almeida at the Praça da Figueira, 1971.

Batalha
 Equestrian statue of Nuno Álvares Pereira close to Mosteiro Santa Maria da Vitória.

Cantanhede
 Equestrian statue of General António Luís de Meneses.

Porto
Equestrian statue of King Pedro IV at the Praça da Liberdade.
 Equestrian statue of King João VI at the João Gonçalves Zarco square.
 Equestrian statue of Vímara Peres by Barata Feyo in front of the Oporto Cathedral, 1968.

Vila Viçosa
 Equestrian statue of King João IV in front of the Paço Ducal de Vila Viçosa.

Romania
Bucharest
 Equestrian Statue of Michael the Brave at the University Square, 1874.
 Equestrian Statue of Carol I, 1939, by Ivan Meštrović, destroyed by the communists after 1948
 Equestrian Statue of Ferdinand I, 1940, by Ivan Meštrović, destroyed by the communists after 1948
Equestrian Statue of Saint George, 1940, destroyed by the communists after 1948
Equestrian Statue of Carol I, 2010, by Florin Codre
Equestrian Statue of Michael the Brave at the Michael the Brave 30th Guards Brigade, 2015

Cluj-Napoca
 Equestrian Monument of Matthias Corvinus, 1902
Equestrian Statue of Saint George, 1904
Equestrian Statue of Michael the Brave, 1976

Focşani
 Equestrian Statue of Alexander Suvorov at the battlefield of Battle of Rymnik. The first sculpture by Boris Eduards was erected in 1913, but was lost during WWI. A new sculpture by Marius Butunoiu was erected in 1959.

Iași
 Equestrian Statue of Stephen the Great, by Emmanuel Frémiet, in front of the Palace of Culture, 1883.
 Attacking Cavalryman Statue, by Ioan C. Dimitriu-Bârlad, in front of the Copou Park, 1927.
 Equestrian Statue of Michael the Brave, 2002.

Oradea

Equestrian Statue of Ferdinand I, 1924, destroyed by the communists after 1948
 Equestrian Statue of Michael the Brave, 1994
Equestrian Statue of Ferdinand I, 2019

Târgu Mureş
 Equestrian Statue of Avram Iancu by Florin Codre, 1978.

Russia
See: List of equestrian statues in Russia

Serbia
Belgrade
 Equestrian of Mihailo Obrenović III, Prince of Serbia by Enrico Pazzi at the Republic Square, 1882.

Niš
 Monument to the Liberators by Antun Augustinčić at the Oslobodjenje Square, 1937.
 Equestrian of King Aleksandar I Karađorđević by Radeta Stanković, 1939–1946 (demolished by communists), restored in 2004.

Novi Sad
Equestrian Statue of King Petar I Karađorđević, 2018.

Zrenjanin
 Equestrian of King Petar I Karađorđević by Rudolf Valdec, 1926–1941 (demolished by Nazis during occupation), restored in 2004.

Slovakia
Bratislava
 Equestrian statue of King Svätopluk I of Great Moravia at Bratislava Castle.
 Equestrian statue of Queen Maria Theresa of Austria in the gardens of Grassalkovich Palace.
 Equestrian statue of Saint George at the Saint George's Fountain, in the courtyard of the Primate's Palace.

Komárno
 Equestrian statue of King Stephen I of Hungary.

Štúrovo
 Equestrian statue of King John III Sobieski of Poland.

Žilina
 Equestrian statue of Jozef Miloslav Hurban in Žilina.

Slovenia
Ljubljana

 Rudolf Maister, Slovenian army general and poet, sculpture by Jakov Brdar. It stands in front of the Ljubljana railway station.

South Africa
Cape Town
 Equestrian of Louis Botha in front of the parliament of South Africa.

Kimberley
 Equestrian of Cecil Rhodes

Pretoria
 Equestrian of Andries Pretorius.
 Equestrian of Louis Botha in front of the Union Buildings.

Port Elizabeth
 Horse Memorial (Tribute to the horses lost in the Second Boer War)

Spain
See: List of equestrian statues in Spain

Sri Lanka
 Sangiliyan Statue, Equestrian of Cankili II of Jaffna.

Sudan
Khartoum
 Equestrian of Field Marshal Kitchener.

Sweden
Stockholm
 Saint George and Dragon by Bernt Notke, Gamla Stan.
 Saint George slaying the dragon in Storkyrkan.
 Equestrian of Karl XIV Johan by Bengt Erland Fogelberg located at Slussplan on Gamla Stan.
 Equestrian statue of Gustavus Adolphus at Gustav Adolfs torg.
 Equestrian of Karl X Gustav in front of Nordic Museum at Djurgården.
 Equestrian of Karl XV in front of Biological Museum at Djurgården.

Gothenburg
 Equestrian called Kopparmärra of Karl IX, standing at Kungsportsplaten.

Helsingborg
 Equestrian of field marshal Magnus Stenbock, standing at Stortorget.

Linköping
 Equestrian of Folke Filbyter searching for his grandchild, statue by Carl Milles.

Malmö
 Equestrian of Karl X Gustav, standing at Stortorget.

Vänersborg
 Equestrian of Saint Martin by Carl Milles, 1951.

Switzerland
Basel
Saint Martin of Tours (316–397), 19th century copy, at Basel Minster.
Saint Martin of Tours   (316–397) original statue, after 1343, in Museum Kleines Klingental.
Saint George (c.275/281–303), copy, at Basel Minster.
  Saint George   (c.275/281–303) original statue, after 1372, in Museum Kleines Klingental.

Bern
 Rudolf von Erlach (1299–1360) by Joseph Simon Volmar and Urs Bargetzi, 1849, at Grabenpromenade since 1969.
 Henri Guisan (1874–1960) by Laurent Boillat, 1949, at Library am Guisanplatz.

Elm
 Monument to Alexander Suvorov (c. 1729–1800)

Fribourg
 Berthold IV, Duke of Zähringen  (1125–1186) by Antoine Claraz, 1965, at Derrière-les-Remparts 9.

Geneva
 Monument to General Dufour (1787–1875) by Karl Alfred Lanz, 1884, on Place Neuve.
 Charles II, Duke of Brunswick (1804–1873) equestrian bronze by Auguste Cain, 1879, part of Brunswick Monument.
 Colombe de la Paix and Aigle de Genève: two equestrian sculptures with a female and a male rider by Frédéric Schmied, 1939, at Quai Turrettini.

Lausanne
 Equestrian statue of Henri Guisan (1874–1960) by Otto Bänninger, 1967, at Ouchy.

Ligornetto
Charles II, Duke of Brunswick, plaster by Vincenzo Vela, 1874–1876, in Museo Vincenzo Vela.

Muralto
Saint Victor Maurus (San Vittore Il Moro) relief by Martino Benzonis, 1460–1462, on the church tower of the Collegiata di San Vittore

St. Gallen
 Martin of Tours (316–397) by Josef Büsser, 1936, at St. Martin Bruggen church.

St. Gotthard Pass
 Monument to Alexander Suvorov (c. 1729–1800) by Dmitry Tougarinov, 1999.

Zürich
 Statue of Hans Waldmann (1435–1489) by Hermann Haller, 1937, at Münsterbrücke respectively Münsterhof and Stadthausquai.

Syria
Aleppo
 Equestrian statue of Bassel al-Assad.

Damascus
 Monument of Sultan of Egypt and Syria Saladin.

Thailand
Bangkok
 Equestrian of King Rama V at the Royal Plaza.
 Equestrian of King Taksin at Wongwian Yai.

Chanthaburi
 Equestrian of King Taksin at Thung Na Choei.

Chiang Mai
 Equestrian of King Naresuan at Thung Yang Thap.
Lampang
 Equestrian of King Naresuan at Ko Kha.

Phra Nakhon Si Ayutthaya
 Equestrian of King Naresuan at Thung Makham Yong.

Phitsanulok
 Equestrian of King Rama I at Phitsanulok.

Saraburi
 Equestrian of King Taksin at Adisorn Military Camp.

Tunisia
Tunis
 Equestrian of Habib Bourguiba in La Goulette. The statue was initially installed on the Avenue Habib Bourguiba in downtown Tunis in 1978 and was sent to La Goulette in 1987. In 2016 it was restored to the Avenue Habib Bourguiba.

Turkey
Ankara
 Equestrian of Mustafa Kemal Atatürk by Heinrich Krippel at the Ulus Square, 1927.
 Equestrian of Mustafa Kemal Atatürk (Industrial warfare under Atatürk control) by Metin Yurdanur, 2001.
 Equestrian of Mustafa Kemal Atatürk by Pietro Canonica in front of the Ethnography Museum, 1927.
 Equestrian named Seğmenler Anıtı by Burhan Alkar in the Seğmenler park, 1983

Antalya
 Equestrian of Mustafa Kemal Atatürk by Hüseyin Gezer at the Cumhuriyet Meydani.
 Equestrian of Kaykhusraw I by Meret Öwezov at the Yavuz Özcan park, 2004.

Bursa
 Equestrian of Mustafa Kemal Atatürk.

Samsun
 Statue of Honor by Heinrich Krippel, 1931.

Ukraine
Kyiv
 Equestrian of Bohdan Khmelnytsky. Opened July 11, 1888 at the Sofia area. Sculptor Michael Mikeshin.
 Equestrian of Petro Konashevych-Sahaidachny at Kontraktova Square. Established in 2001. Architects: Jarikov and Kuharenko. Sculptors: Shvetsov, Krylov, Sidoruk.
 Monument of Nikolay Shchors in Taras Shevchenko Boulevard. The monument was unveiled April 29, 1954. Sculptors: Boroday, Sukhodolov, Lysenko, architects:  Zavarov and Vlasov.
 Monument of Cossack Mamay at Maidan Nezalezhnosti.
 Monument "To the defenders of the boundaries of the Fatherland of all generations" (Cossacks) at Zolotovorotskaya street.
 Monument of Sviatoslav I at Lviv Square.

Izmail
 Equestrian monument of Alexander Suvorov at Suvorov avenue. Foto

Kamianka-Buzka
 Monument to the 1st Cavalry Army near the city.

Kharkiv
 Monument to the founders of Kharkiv (Cossack Kharko statue).

Luhansk
 Monument of Kliment Voroshilov.
 Monument of Prince Igor (between Luhansk and Stanytsia Luhanska).

Lviv
 Equestrian of Daniel of Halych.

United Kingdom
See: List of equestrian statues in the United Kingdom

United States
See: List of equestrian statues in the United States

Uruguay
Montevideo
 Equestrian of José Gervasio Artigas at the La Plaza Independencia.

Minas
 Equestrian of José Gervasio Artigas by Setillo Belloni in Cerro Ventura, 1974.

Uzbekistan
Tashkent
 Equestrian of Tamerlane at the Amir Timur Square at the end of the pedestrian street.

Venezuela
Caracas
 Equestrian of Simón Bolívar at the Plaza Bolívar, in the centre of the city. 1870s replica of the original in Lima.

References

External links
 Equestrian Statues by Kees van Tilburg